The 2007 Singapore Open Super Series (officially known as the Aviva Open Singapore Super Series 2007 for sponsorship reasons) was a badminton tournament which took place at Singapore Indoor Stadium in Singapore, from 1 to 6 May 2007 and had a total purse of $200,000.

Tournament 
The 2007 Singapore Open Super Series was the fifth tournament of the 2007 BWF Super Series and also part of the Singapore Open championships, which had been held since 1929. This was also the first tournament that offered valuable ranking points for the qualification to the 2008 Summer Olympic Games.

Venue 
This international tournament was held at Singapore Indoor Stadium in Singapore.

Point distribution 
Below is the point distribution for each phase of the tournament based on the BWF points system for the BWF Super Series event.

Prize money 
The total prize money for this tournament was US$200,000. Distribution of prize money was in accordance with BWF regulations.

Men's singles

Seeds 

 Lin Dan (quarter-finals)
 Bao Chunlai (withdrew)
 Chen Jin (second round)
 Peter Gade (semi-finals)
 Chen Hong (first round)
 Lee Chong Wei (first round)
 Chen Yu (final)
 Kenneth Jonassen (quarter-finals)

Finals

Top half

Section 1

Section 2

Bottom half

Section 3

Section 4

Women's singles

Seeds 

 Xie Xingfang (final)
 Zhang Ning (champion)
 Zhu Lin (first round)
 Huaiwen Xu (semi-finals)
 Lu Lan (first round)
 Pi Hongyan (quarter-finals)
 Yao Jie (first round)
 Wang Chen (quarter-finals)

Finals

Top half

Section 1

Section 2

Bottom half

Section 3

Section 4

Men's doubles

Seeds 

 Fu Haifeng / Cai Yun (champions)
 Jens Eriksen / Martin Lundgaard Hansen (second round)
 Markis Kido / Hendra Setiawan (semi-finals)
 Candra Wijaya /  Tony Gunawan (semi-finals)
 Koo Kien Keat / Tan Boon Heong (first round)
 Choong Tan Fook / Lee Wan Wah (final)
 Anthony Clark / Robert Blair (second round)
 Jung Jae-sung / Lee Jae-jin (quarter-finals)

Finals

Top half

Section 1

Section 2

Bottom half

Section 3

Section 4

Women's doubles

Seeds 

 Zhang Yawen / Wei Yili (champions)
 Chien Yu-chin / Cheng Wen-hsing (quarter-finals)
 Lee Kyung-won / Lee Hyo-jung (semi-finals)
 Wong Pei Tty / Chin Eei Hui (second round)
 Gao Ling / Zhang Jiewen (semi-finals)
 Zhao Tingting / Yang Wei (final)
 Greysia Polii / Vita Marissa (quarter-finals)
 Jiang Yanmei / Li Yujia (quarter-finals)

Finals

Top half

Section 1

Section 2

Bottom half

Section 3

Section 4

Mixed doubles

Seeds 

 Nova Widianto / Liliyana Natsir (semi-finals)
 Xie Zhongbo / Zhang Yawen (semi-finals)
 Sudket Prapakamol / Saralee Thungthongkam (final)
 Thomas Laybourn / Kamilla Rytter Juhl (withdrew)
 Zheng Bo / Gao Ling (quarter-finals)
 Anthony Clark / Donna Kellogg (first round)
 Nathan Robertson / Gail Emms (quarter-finals)
 Flandy Limpele / Vita Marissa (champions)

Finals

Top half

Section 1

Section 2

Bottom half

Section 3

Section 4

References

External links 
Official website
Tournament Link

Singapore Open (badminton)
Singapore
2007 in Singaporean sport